The James Blake House is the oldest surviving house in Boston, Massachusetts, United States. The house was built in 1661 and the date was confirmed by dendrochronology in 2007. It is located at 735 Columbia Road, in Edward Everett Square, and just a block from Massachusetts Avenue. The Dorchester Historical Society now owns the building and tours are given on the third Sunday of the month.

History
The house was built in a Western English style of post-medieval architecture by James Blake, an immigrant from England.  The Blake family owned the house until 1825 when it was acquired by the Williams family. In 1891, the City of Boston acquired the house. In order to save the house from demolition in 1896, the Dorchester Historical Society acquired the property from the city and moved the house less than 500 feet from its original location by Massachusetts Avenue to its current location. In 1978, the interior and exterior of the house were designated as a Boston Landmark by the Boston Landmarks Commission.

The immediate area, as well as the house, have been undergoing an extensive renovation and preservation. The house was completely re-shingled and the grounds improved.

See also
List of the oldest buildings in Massachusetts
National Register of Historic Places listings in southern Boston, Massachusetts

References

External links
Dorchester Historical Society: James Blake House
City of Boston, Boston Landmarks CommissionJames Blake House Study Report

Historic house museums in Massachusetts
Museums in Boston
Houses in Boston
National Register of Historic Places in Boston
Landmarks in Dorchester, Boston
Houses on the National Register of Historic Places in Suffolk County, Massachusetts
Houses completed in 1661